John Moore (born July 31, 1964) is an American rower. He competed in the men's coxed pair event at the 1992 Summer Olympics.

References

External links
 

1964 births
Living people
American male rowers
Olympic rowers of the United States
Rowers at the 1992 Summer Olympics
Sportspeople from New York City